Brett Naylor (born 10 March 1957) is a New Zealand swimmer. He competed in two events at the 1976 Summer Olympics.

References

External links
 

1957 births
Living people
New Zealand male freestyle swimmers
Olympic swimmers of New Zealand
Swimmers at the 1976 Summer Olympics
Sportspeople from Invercargill
Swimmers at the 1974 British Commonwealth Games
Swimmers at the 1978 Commonwealth Games
Commonwealth Games competitors for New Zealand
20th-century New Zealand people